Mother Schmuckers is a 2021 Belgian comedy film directed and written by Harpo Guit and Lenny Guit. The film stars Claire Bodson, Maxi Delmelle, Harpo Guit, Yannick Renier, Habib Ben Tanfous, and Mathieu Amalric.

The film had its world premiere at the 2021 Sundance Film Festival on January 30, 2021.

Plot

Cast
 Maxi Delmelle as Issachar
 Harpo Guit as Zabulon
 Claire Bodson as Cachemire, Issachar and Zabulon's mother
 Yannick Renier as Anthony le flic, a policeman
 Habib Ben Tanfous as Choukri, a wannabe filmmaker friend of the brothers
 Toni d’Antonio as Daniel, Cachemire's stalker
 Chaida Chady Suku Suku as Violeta, Cachemire's pimp
 Mathieu Amalric as Le Père, Issachar and Zabulon's father
 Fresco as Jacques-Janvier, the kidnapped dog.

Release
The film had its premiere at the 2021 Sundance Film Festival on January 30, 2021, in the Midnight section.

Reception
The film received mixed reviews. On Rotten Tomatoes, the film has an approval rating of 52% based on reviews from 29 critics, with an average rating of 5/10. The critics consensus reads: "Very little is off-limits in Mother Schmuckers' gleefully offensive pursuit of provocation -- unfortunately, it often mistakes shock value for genuine laughs."

References

External links
 
 
 

Belgian comedy films
Belgian independent films
2021 comedy films
2021 independent films
2020s French-language films